The meridian 6° east of Greenwich is a line of longitude that extends from the North Pole across the Arctic Ocean, Europe, Africa, the Atlantic Ocean, the Southern Ocean, and Antarctica to the South Pole.

The 6th meridian east forms a great circle with the 174th meridian west.

From Pole to Pole
Starting at the North Pole and heading south to the South Pole, the 6th meridian east passes through:

{| class="wikitable plainrowheaders"
! scope="col" width="125" | Co-ordinates
! scope="col" | Country, territory or sea
! scope="col" | Notes
|-
| style="background:#b0e0e6;" | 
! scope="row" style="background:#b0e0e6;" | Arctic Ocean
| style="background:#b0e0e6;" |
|-
| style="background:#b0e0e6;" | 
! scope="row" style="background:#b0e0e6;" | Atlantic Ocean
| style="background:#b0e0e6;" |
|-
| 
! scope="row" | 
| Entering at Godøya in Møre og Romsdal. Exiting south of Eigersund in Rogaland.
|-
| style="background:#b0e0e6;" | 
! scope="row" style="background:#b0e0e6;" | North Sea
| style="background:#b0e0e6;" |
|-
| 
! scope="row" | 
| Passing just east of Apeldoorn and Arnhem
|-
| 
! scope="row" | 
| For about 10 km
|-
| 
! scope="row" | 
|
|-
| 
! scope="row" | 
| For about 11 km
|-
| 
! scope="row" | 
|
|-
| 
! scope="row" | 
| For about 2 km, passing just west of Aachen
|-
| 
! scope="row" | 
| For about 4 km
|-
| 
! scope="row" | 
|
|-
| 
! scope="row" | 
| Passing just west of the city of Luxembourg
|-
| 
! scope="row" | 
| Passing through Besançon
|-
| 
! scope="row" | 
| For about 9 km, just west of Geneva
|-
| 
! scope="row" | 
| Meeting the Mediterranean Sea just east of Toulon
|-
| style="background:#b0e0e6;" | 
! scope="row" style="background:#b0e0e6;" | Mediterranean Sea
| style="background:#b0e0e6;" |
|-
| 
! scope="row" | 
|
|-
| 
! scope="row" | 
|
|-
| 
! scope="row" | 
|
|-valign="top"
| style="background:#b0e0e6;" | 
! scope="row" style="background:#b0e0e6;" | Atlantic Ocean
| style="background:#b0e0e6;" | Passing just west of the island of São Tomé,  Passing just east of the island of Annobón, 
|-
| style="background:#b0e0e6;" | 
! scope="row" style="background:#b0e0e6;" | Southern Ocean
| style="background:#b0e0e6;" |
|-
| 
! scope="row" | Antarctica
| Queen Maud Land, claimed by 
|-
|}

See also
5th meridian east
7th meridian east

e006th meridian east